Dalmiro is a given name. Notable people with the name include:

 Dalmiro Finol (1920–1994), Venezuelan baseball player
 Dalmiro Sáenz (1926–2016), Argentinian writer and playwright
  (1905–1994), Argentinian military personnel